This glossary of genetics is a list of definitions of terms and concepts commonly used in the study of genetics and related disciplines in biology, including molecular biology, cell biology, and evolutionary biology. It is split across two articles:
This page, Glossary of genetics (0–L), lists terms beginning with numbers and those beginning with the letters A through L.
Glossary of genetics (M–Z) lists terms beginning with the letters M through Z.

The glossary is intended as introductory material for novices; for more specific and technical detail, see the article corresponding to each term. For related terms, see Glossary of evolutionary biology and Glossary of chemistry.



0–9

A

B

C

D

E

F

G

H

I

J

K

L

See also
Introduction to genetics
Outline of genetics
Outline of cell biology
Glossary of biology
Glossary of chemistry
Glossary of evolutionary biology

References

Further reading

External links
National Human Genome Research Institute (NHGRI) Talking Glossary of Genetic Terms

Glossary
Genetics
Molecular-biology-related lists
Wikipedia glossaries using description lists